Saltwater Heroes is an Australian reality television series produced by Northern Pictures for the Discovery Channel. The series is hosted by Andrew "ET" Ettingshausen and portrays the real life events of crews aboard commercial fishing vessels and what life is like for commercial fisherman across Australia.

Background
The program received funding from Screen Australia in late 2014 for a four-part series. The series is produced by Northern Pictures for Discovery Australia and Discovery International.

During filming, Ettingshausen suffered a problem with his diving regulator while underwater diving during filming in Queensland. Ettingshausen was unable to breathe air, and required assistance from other people diving near him, including sharing an oxygen regulator.

Broadcast
The series premiered in Australia and New Zealand on Discovery Channel on 5 August 2015.

Internationally, the series premiered on the English language feed of Discovery Channel in Asia on 24 August 2015.

Episodes

Indicates premiere live broadcast rating according to overnight (live) rating from OzTam through Foxtel.

References

External links 
 

2015 Australian television series debuts
Discovery Channel original programming
English-language television shows
Fishing television series
Television series by Northern Pictures